24 Heures (French for "24 hours") may refer to:

Events
 24 Heures du Mans, the French-language name of 24 Hours of Le Mans, an annual sports car race held near Le Mans, France
 24 heures vélo de Louvain-la-Neuve (English: The 24-Hour Bike Ride of Louvain-la-Neuve), an annual bicycle festival held in Louvain-la-Neuve, Belgium

Publications
 24 heures (Switzerland), a regional daily newspaper published in Lausanne, Switzerland
 24 heures (Abidjan), a daily newspaper published in Abidjan, Côte d'Ivoire
 24 Heures, the French-language edition in Montreal, Canada, of 24 Hours (newspaper), a chain of free daily newspapers published in Canada

See also
 24 Hours (disambiguation)

zh:24小時